Herron is a census-designated place (CDP) in Hill County, Montana, United States. The population was 43 at the 2010 census.

Geography
Herron is located in eastern Hill County at  (48.514344, -109.788942). It is bordered to the east by West Havre and to the west by Beaver Creek. U.S. Route 2 forms the northern border of the CDP, running east  to the center of Havre, the county seat, and west  to Gildford. U.S. Route 87 forms the eastern and southeastern borders of the CDP and terminates at US 2. To the south US 87 leads  to Box Elder.

The Havre City–County Airport is in the northern part of Herron.

Demographics

As of the census of 2000, there were 100 people, 43 households, and 34 families residing in the CDP. The population density was 21.4 people per square mile (8.3/km2). There were 48 housing units at an average density of 10.3/sq mi (4.0/km2). The racial makeup of the CDP was 95.00% White, 3.00% Native American, and 2.00% from two or more races.

There were 43 households, out of which 23.3% had children under the age of 18 living with them, 65.1% were married couples living together, 11.6% had a female householder with no husband present, and 20.9% were non-families. 16.3% of all households were made up of individuals, and 4.7% had someone living alone who was 65 years of age or older. The average household size was 2.33 and the average family size was 2.56.

In the CDP, the population was spread out, with 17.0% under the age of 18, 6.0% from 18 to 24, 22.0% from 25 to 44, 36.0% from 45 to 64, and 19.0% who were 65 years of age or older. The median age was 48 years. For every 100 females, there were 104.1 males. For every 100 females age 18 and over, there were 118.4 males.

The median income for a household in the CDP was $37,727, and the median income for a family was $26,250. Males had a median income of $33,125 versus $32,917 for females. The per capita income for the CDP was $11,779. None of the population and none of the families were below the poverty line.

References

Census-designated places in Hill County, Montana
Census-designated places in Montana